The Vanuatu Mobile Force (VMF) is a small, mobile corps of 300 volunteers that makes up Vanuatu's military. Its primary task is to assist the Vanuatu Police Force. However, should Vanuatu be attacked, then the VMF will act as the first line of defence. In 1994, VMF deployed 50 people to Papua New Guinea, as their first peacekeeping mission.

Though the armed forces in Vanuatu have never overthrown a government, members of the VMF angry about their pay detained President Jean-Marie Léyé and Deputy Prime Minister Barak Sopé on October 12, 1996 but released them just a few hours later.

List of commanders
 Sato Kilman (1984 - 1986)
 James Aru (? - ?)
Lieutenant Colonel Willie Vire (? - ?)
Lieutenant Colonel Job Esau (? - 2015)
Colonel Robson Iavro (2015–present)

Equipment of Vanuatu Mobile Forces

Infantry weapons

References

Vanuatu
Military of Vanuatu